The 1999 Harvard Crimson football team represented Harvard University in the 1999 NCAA Division I-AA football season. Harvard compiled a 5–5 record (3–4 conference record) and finished fifth in the Ivy League.

Schedule

References

Harvard
Harvard Crimson football seasons
Harvard Crimson football
Harvard Crimson football